Quest (previously known as Spencers Galleria) is one of the largest shopping malls in Kolkata, India. It is located on Syed Amir Ali Avenue at Beck Bagan, Park Circus.

Facilities
It also houses a six-screen Insignia class multiplex INOX cinema, Spencer's Hyper Market and Starmark bookstore in the basement. The mall has stores of various luxury brands like Gucci and Emporio Armani.

Gallery

Also See
 South City Mall
 Mani Square Mall
 New Market

References

External links 
Midnight shopping festival

2013 establishments in West Bengal
Shopping malls established in 2013
Shopping malls in Kolkata